William B. Woodin (September 25, 1824 – November 1, 1893) was an American lawyer and politician from New York.

Life
William B. Woodin was born in Genoa, New York on September 25, 1824. He attended the district schools, Moravia Academy, and Cortland Academy in Homer. Then he studied law, was admitted to the bar, and commenced practice in Aurora. He was a member of the New York State Assembly (Cayuga Co., 3rd D.) in 1855. After his election as Surrogate, he removed to the county seat Auburn.

He was Surrogate of Cayuga County from 1860 to 1871; and a member of the New York State Senate (25th D.) from 1870 to 1877, sitting in the 93rd, 94th, 95th, 96th, 97th, 98th, 99th and 100th New York State Legislatures. In 1877, he was accused of having taken bribes from William M. Tweed, but a State Senate investigation concluded that he was innocent. Nevertheless, Woodin declined to run for re-election.

He was again a member of the State Senate (26th D.) in 1880 and 1881. He was a delegate to the 1880 Republican National Convention where he opposed Roscoe Conkling's plan to nominate Ulysses S. Grant for a third term. In 1882, Woodin abandoned the Republican candidate for Governor, Charles J. Folger, and supported Democrat Grover Cleveland instead.

He was buried at the Fort Hill Cemetery in Auburn.

Sources
 The New York Civil List compiled by Franklin Benjamin Hough, Stephen C. Hutchins and Edgar Albert Werner (1867; pg. 430)
 The New York Civil List compiled by Franklin Benjamin Hough, Stephen C. Hutchins and Edgar Albert Werner (1870; pg. 444 and 479)
 Life Sketches of Executive Officers, and Members of the Legislature of the State of New York, Vol. III by H. H. Boone & Theodore P. Cook (1870; pg. 141f)
 EX-SENATOR WOODIN DEAD in NYT on November 2, 1893

External links

1824 births
1893 deaths
New York (state) state senators
People from Genoa, New York
Members of the New York State Assembly
New York (state) Republicans
New York (state) Whigs
19th-century American politicians
New York (state) state court judges
Missing middle or first names
19th-century American judges